Rostovsky (masculine), Rostovskaya (feminine), or Rostovskoye (neuter) is the name of several rural localities in Russia:
Rostovsky (rural locality), a settlement in Khvastovichsky District of Kaluga Oblast
Rostovskoye, Arkhangelsk Oblast, a village in Konetsgorsky Selsoviet of Vinogradovsky District of Arkhangelsk Oblast
Rostovskoye, Kaliningrad Oblast, a settlement in Kamensky Rural Okrug of Chernyakhovsky District of Kaliningrad Oblast